The Instalaza C90 is a 90 mm disposable, shoulder-fired and one-man operated rocket-propelled grenade launcher (RPG) which can be fitted with a VN38-C night vision device for full night combat capability. It is being used as an infantry-type weapon, with Instalaza also claiming it to be the, "lightest infantry weapons system in its class".

Variants
The following are variants produced by Instalaza:
 C90-CR (M3) – equipped with hollow-charge warhead of different types. Has armor penetration of 400 mm.
 C90-CR-RB (M3.5) and the C-90-CR-RB (M3) – equipped with hollow-charge warhead. Has armor penetration of 500 mm.
 C90-CR-AM (M3.5) – also has a shaped head charge, but with a special body that provides antipersonnel fragmentation
 C90-CR-FIM (M3.5) – contains more than 1.3 kg of red phosphorus composition, producing incendiary effects and smoke.
 C90-CR-BK (M3.5) – has a tandem warhead precursor for anti-bunker/building fortifications. The warhead pierces the walls and goes through the wall before it explodes inside the interior.
 C-90-CR-IN (M3) – is a training model with inert warhead.

Operational history

2022 Russian invasion of Ukraine 
After the Russian invasion of Ukraine in 2022, the Spanish government, like other Western governments, sent Ukraine shipments of weapons, equipment, ammunition and vehicles, including numerous C90 grenade launchers. There are images of at least one Russian infantry fighting vehicle being destroyed by a C-90.

Users

Colombian Army

 
 Ecuadorian Army

 
 Salvadoran Army

Estonian Defence Forces.

Indonesian Army. In use with the infantry units and Special Forces. Versions C-90CR antiarmor, C-90-CR-RB (M3), C-90AM antipersonnel and C-90BK bunker buster.

Indian Army;  C-90-CR-RB (M3) only.
 
Royal Brunei Land Forces

Italian Army. In use with Special Forces. Versions C-90CR antiarmor, C-90AM antipersonnel and C-90BK bunker buster.

Malaysian Army

 Portuguese Air Force

Saudi Arabian Army

Spanish Army
Spanish Marines
Spanish Air Force
Guardia Civil

Kuwait National Guard

Territorial Defense Forces: 1,370 rockets

References

External links
Instalaza Homepage

Anti-tank rockets
Weapons of Spain
Military equipment introduced in the 1990s